City University College of Ajman (CUCA) is an institution of higher education located in Ajman in the United Arab Emirates.

CUCA received its license from the UAE Ministry of Higher Education and Scientific Research (MOHESR) in August 2011. It provides education for UAE nationals and international students.

All the academic programs offered at CUCA are accredited by the MOHESR. The education program at CUCA is based primarily on the U.S. system model with morning, evening, and weekend classes available.  The medium of instruction at CUCA is English, unless otherwise indicated.

References

External links

Universities and colleges in the Emirate of Ajman